Teja Singh was an Indian Sikh scholar, teacher, author and translator.

Early life 

Teja Singh was born on June 2, 1894, in Adiala village, Rawalpindi district, Punjab Province, British India to parents Bhai Bhalakar Singh and Srusti. He grazed livestock and studied within the village until 1908, when we moved to Rawalpindi city to garner a further and better education.

Books

Books in English
Growth of Responsibility in Sikhism (1919)
The Asa-di-Var (1926)
Highroads of Sikh History, in three volumes (1935), published by Orient Longman
Sikhism: Its Ideals and Institutions, published by Orient Longman
Punjabi-English Dictionary, revised and edited for Lahore University
English-Punjabi Dictionary, Vol.1 (Punjabi University Solan).

References

External links
Teja Singh materials in the South Asian American Digital Archive (SAADA)

1894 births
1958 deaths
Canadian Sikhs
People from Rawalpindi
Indian emigrants to Canada
Indian Sikhs
Scholars of Sikhism
Sikh writers
Writers from Vancouver
Indian translators